Palio dubia is a species of sea slug, a nudibranch, a shell-less marine gastropod mollusc in the family Polyceridae.

Distribution 
This species was described from Norway. It has subsequently been reported from the United Kingdom north to Scandinavia, Russia and Greenland. It has also been reported from the Pacific coast of Canada.

Ecology
In Scotland and Ireland Palio dubia feeds on the bryozoan Eucratea loricata.

References

Polyceridae
Taxa named by Michael Sars
Gastropods described in 1829